Alfred Keller (17 June 1875 – 8 March 1945) was an Austrian architect. His work was part of the architecture event in the art competition at the 1932 Summer Olympics.

References

1875 births
1945 deaths
20th-century Austrian architects
Olympic competitors in art competitions
Architects from Graz